Kala Khel is a clan of Tirah Adam Khel.Kala Khel Area adjacent to FR Peshawar and FR Kohat is a part of Khyber Agency administratively whereas on the Topo - Sheet of Survey of Pakistan, it has been shown as the part of Peshawar Division and Kohat Division. Adam Khel is a sub-tribe of Afridi that has originated from the Karlanee or Karlani group of Pashtuns. The Kala Khel clan of Tirah Adam Khel inhabits in FR Peshawar region and in Bara and Torghar as well. It can be found on Google Maps at 33.728623N,71.55256E and Tirah valley of Khyber agency at 33.73N, 71.01E. 

Boundary of kala khel meet with, Ali khel ' Pareedi ' Akhorwal' toorchaper abd Peshawar district to east, while the Kala Khel of Tirah valley borders Orakzi to south, Shalobar to east, Bhattan and Bar Qamber Khel to west and Malikdin Khel to east. The location of Kala Khel in FR Peshawar is also known as Ocha Lagada. 

The Assistant Political Agent of Bara subdivision of Khyber Agency looks after the matters of Kala Khel due to its presence in Tirah valley. The Political Agent of Khyber Agency is also the administrative head who has great authority and control. The overall administration of FATA is run by FATA Secretariat based in Peshawar, the Capital of the Khyber Pakhtunkhwa.

People and race
As a sub-clan of Tirah Adam Khel, all inhabitants of Kala Khel ethnically are Afridi Pakhtoons. The Afridis have originated from the Karlanee or Karlani group of Pashtuns.

Geography
 Kala Khel Area adjacent to FR Peshawar and FR Kohat is a part of Khyber Agency administratively whereas on the Topo - Sheet of Survey of Pakistan, it has been shown as the part of Peshawar Division and Kohat Division   The area of Kala Khel of FR Peshawar  is hilly with average heights of over 1,000 m (3,300 ft) above sea level. Gorgora, Palosa, Olive trees can be seen on hills almost amounting to forest.

The area of Kala Khel of Tirah valley is also mountainous, with average heights of some 2,500 m (8,000 ft) above sea level. Higher still are the blue pines; but below on the shelving plains are nothing but fruit trees.

Religion
Islam is the only religion of the people here. All are Sunni Muslim and follower of the Hanafi thought of School (Fiqah).

Places to visit
 Grand Central Mosque (Jumma Masjid)-(Jumy Jumaat)
 Saaoke (Famous Hilly Site for Picnic)
 Malik Haji Hakeem Khan (Late) S/O Malik Jaffar Khan (Late) kallay
 Khro Talao (Pool Like Site for Picnic)
 Mangoti  (Famous Picnic Spot)
 G.H.S Malik Jaffar Khan Killi (High School)
 Mountains (Manza & Gorro Hills)
 Gorrow Kalli  (Cave Houses)
 Sary Khwa (Famous Picnic Spot)
 Perwaray (Famous Picnic Spot)
 Gheedar Colony
 Haji Barakath Kalay
 Seth Haji Muhammad Din Afridi (Late) s/o Khayal Din Afridi (Late) Kalay (Mast Ali Khel)
The Green Field in Village Palosa Bunair Khan Kalay
 The Grand Sharjah Kalay                                                                          
 16=Landay kalay [small london]
17. Condoli Kalay -کنڈولی کلے

18.Malik Hakim khan Kalay Malik Abad

Languages
Pashtu or Pukhto is spoken as a mother language here, but English and Urdu are also known to the people due to a decent literacy rate of the area.

Education
Education is on the priority list of the Kala Khel people. The young generation is very keen to get quality Education. For this great purpose, the Government has established many Primary,Middle and a High Schools . Apart from Government Schools, private Schools have also been set up to control the deficiency of Schools due to the high ratio of enrollments. The Khyber Agency has the highest ratio of literacy rate compared to other Agencies of FATA.

Around 80% of the young generation is well versed with Computers and are proficient in Information Technology domain. One of the leading scholars in the domain of Information Technology is Allauddin Afridi. He started the first Computer Center in the village. Later on, one of the prominent organization named as "Khyber Development Organization" started English Language, Tuition Center & Nazira Quran Center to increase literacy.

 Govt. High School, Malik Jaffar Khan Kalay
 Govt. Primary School, Malik Jaffar Khan Kalay
 Govt. Girls Primary School, Malak Jaffar Khan Kalay 
 Govt. Primary School, Sher Khan Kalay 
 Govt. Girls Middle School, Azam Din Kalay 
 Govt. Middle School, Saleem Raza Kalay 
 Govt. Primary School, Babar Khel Kalay Esara Kanda Goray
 Govt.Girls Primary School, Babar Khel Kalay Esara Kanda Goray
 Govt. Middle School, Chorlaka Kala Khel 
 Govt. Girls Primary School, Chorlaka Kala Khel 
 Govt. Middle School, Banda Kala Khel
 Khalifa Children Academy. Main Chowk
 Hamdard Model High School Haji Mewa Din Kalay
 Alkhidmat Model High School Haji Rakham Din Kalay
 Islamia Model School Haji Muhammad Din Afridi Kalay (Mast Ali Khel)
Earlier Fewer students of Kala Khel were interested in competing for Civil Services and aspired for getting Technical Education hoping for better career in the Middle East later on. However, now the young energetic generation of Kala Khel seems more inclined towards Civil Services and aspiring to utilize their potentials in Medical and Engineering in Pakistan.

Agriculture
Agriculture is the main but small source of livelihood here. A variety of crops are grown here due to fertility of the land. Some people here are government employed like teachers, doctors and clerks. But the majority of people earn by working overseas.  Wheat, maize, tobacco, sugar-cane and a wide variety of vegetables are the main crops here.

Mining
Nature has bestowed Federally Administered Tribal Areas with a great potential of natural resources like coal, gas, forests and other minerals. A large reservoir of coal has been discovered in Kala Khel in recent past. Mining is in progress to exploit this natural resource. It can play a vital role in uplift of economic condition of the people and area. The people have taken great interest in mining. Scientific and latest methods are being used to take advantage of this reservoir.

See also
Pashtun tribes
Federally Administered Tribal Areas

References

Karlani Pashtun tribes
Pashto-language surnames
Pakistani names